Louis Jude Ferrigno Jr. (born November 10, 1984) is an American actor. He is best known for his role in the CBS television series S.W.A.T., as Donovan Rocker, a SWAT team leader and decorated officer. He is also known for his roles on Nicky, Ricky, Dicky & Dawn, Teen Wolf, and How I Met Your Mother. His small appearances include The Rookie and 9-1-1.

Early life
Ferrigno Jr. was born in Santa Monica, California, the son of actor-bodybuilder Lou Ferrigno, and actress Carla (Green) Ferrigno.  His father is of Italian descent, his mother is of Swedish and Irish ancestry. In high school, Ferrigno Jr. attended Loyola High School in downtown Los Angeles, eventually transferring to Notre Dame in Sherman Oaks, California.

Ferrigno attended college at the University of Southern California, graduating in 2007 with a B.A. in Communication from the Annenberg School for Communication and a minor in Business Law. After suffering a career-ending knee injury as a walk-on linebacker for the 2007 Rose Bowl Champion USC Trojans, his focus immediately shifted to acting and improvisation.

Ferrigno began his adult career in entertainment as a fitness model and commercial actor. Intensively studying the Meisner technique of dramatic acting and improvisational comedy at the Improv Olympic (iO West) and Upright Citizens Brigade (UCB) in Los Angeles, he soon landed national spots for Comcast (2013), Carl's Jr. (2014), Oscar Mayer (2015), Honda (2015), T-Mobile (2016), Mopar (2016), Navy Federal Credit Union (2016), Subway (2017), and Dr Pepper (2018), among others.

Career
Ferrigno made his television debut in 2013 on the long-running daytime soap, Days of Our Lives. He has since landed numerous recurring roles on successful shows such as How I Met Your Mother, Agents of S.H.I.E.L.D., Teen Wolf, The Young and the Restless, Nicky, Ricky, Dicky & Dawn, Mutt & Stuff, 9-1-1, and the series reboot of S.W.A.T.. He appeared as Hourman on the DC Universe/The CW series Stargirl, which premiered in 2020.
In 2023, Ferrigno Jr. will recur as Ryan in the third season of the Netflix series Outer Banks.

Filmography

Film

Television

References

External links
 

USC Annenberg School for Communication and Journalism alumni
1984 births
People from Sherman Oaks, Los Angeles
Male actors from Los Angeles
21st-century American male actors
People from Santa Monica, California
Living people